Debraď is a village and municipality in Košice-okolie District in the Kosice Region of eastern Slovakia.

History
In historical records the village was first mentioned in 1255 by TH.

Geography
The village lies at an altitude of 267 metres and covers an area of 23.791 km².
It has a population of about 380 people.

Ethnicity
The village has a population of 391 people, the majority (270) is Hungarian.

Government

The village relies on the tax and district offices and fire brigade at Moldava nad Bodvou. The village relies on the police force of Jasov.

Culture
The village has a public library and is connected to cable television. It has a food store.

Sport
The village has a football pitch and gymnasium

Transport
The nearest railway station is located at Moldava nad Bodvou 9 kilometres away.

Genealogical resources

The records for genealogical research are available at the state archive "Statny Archiv in Kosice, Slovakia"

 Roman Catholic church records (births/marriages/deaths): 1792-1894 (parish A)
 Greek Catholic church records (births/marriages/deaths): 1870-1902 (parish B)
 Reformated church records (births/marriages/deaths): 1727-1904 (parish B)

See also
 List of municipalities and towns in Slovakia

External links
https://web.archive.org/web/20070427022352/http://www.statistics.sk/mosmis/eng/run.html
http://www.debrad.sk/
Surnames of living people in Debrad

Villages and municipalities in Košice-okolie District